Daviess County Courthouse is a historic courthouse located at Gallatin, Daviess County, Missouri.  It was designed by P. H. Weathers and built in 1907–1908.  It is a three-story, Renaissance Revival style, cross-plan building of smooth stone.  It is topped with a low cross-gable roof with a wooden bell-shaped clock tower in the center.

It was listed on the National Register of Historic Places in 1980.

References

1908 establishments in Missouri
Clock towers in Missouri
County courthouses in Missouri
Courthouses on the National Register of Historic Places in Missouri
Renaissance Revival architecture in Missouri
Government buildings completed in 1908
Buildings and structures in Daviess County, Missouri
National Register of Historic Places in Daviess County, Missouri